Howard Kelly was a vaudeville and film actor in the United States. He was part of the Pekin Theatre’s stock company. He started in some of William D. Foster’s Foster Photoplay Company films including The Railroad Porter and The Barber.

He had a starring role in The Railroad Porter. He also starred in The Barber with Anna Holt and Edgar Lillison.

He starred with Bessie Brown in Billy King’s musical Now I’m a Mason at the Grand Theatre in Chicago in 1914. He also starred with Brown in King’s The Night Raid at the Grand Theatre in Chicago in 1918.

Theater	
In the Jungle (1915), a musical comedy by Billy King staged at the Grand Theatre
In Society (1915), a Billy King production at the Grand Theatre

Filmography
The Railroad Porter (1912)
The Barber (1916)

References

American actors
Vaudeville performers
Year of birth missing
Year of death missing